The International Pathogenic Neisseria Conference (IPNC) occurs every two years and is a forum for the presentation of cutting-edge research on all aspects of the genus Neisseria. This includes immunology, vaccinology and physiology and metabolism of Neisseria meningitidis, Neisseria gonorrhoeae and the commensal species.

The 21st International Pathogenic Neisseria Conference (IPNC 2018) will be held in Asilomar, California, USA from the 23–28 September 2018.

History 
In the 1970s a series of conferences were held dealing with issues of meningococcal epidemiology and vaccination. Some of these conferences were held in Milano, St. Paul de Vence, and Marseille. But the first official conference was held in San Francisco, California, 1978. The location of the conference switched between North America and Europe until 2006 when the venue was located in Cairns, Australia.

List of Conferences

The Igor Stojiljkovic Memorial Fund 
In memory of Igor Stojiljkovic a scholarship fund has been initiated through the Emory University School of Medicine, to be used exclusively to provide travel funds to young investigators so that they can attend bacterial pathogenesis meetings such as the IPNC.

References

External links 
 IPNC
 IPNC 2016

International conferences
Bacteriology